Morocco is represented in Algeria by an embassy and consulate general in Algiers, as well as two consulates in Oran and Sidi Bel Abbès; Algeria is represented in Morocco by a consulate general in Rabat, and two consulates in Casablanca and Oujda. Relations between the two North African states have been marred by several crises since their independence, particularly the 1963 Sand War, the Western Sahara War of 1975–1991, the closing of the Algeria–Morocco border in 1994, an ongoing disagreement over the political status of Western Sahara and the signing of the Israel–Morocco normalization agreement (as part of the Abraham Accords) in 2020. 

On August 24, 2021 Algeria severed ties with Morocco.

Country comparison

Historical relations
After Morocco had gained independence from France in 1956, King Mohammed V provided arms, money, and medicines to Algerian FLN forces waging a war of independence against French rule; Morocco also served as a rear base for Algerian insurgents to set up training camps for newer recruits. During this period, King Mohammed also refused to negotiate with France over the precise outline of Morocco's border with Algeria, which, since 1830, hadn't been clearly demarcated.

On 23 January 1961 King Hassan of Morocco reported that the Moroccan-Algerian commission at the ministerial level finalized a structure for a United Arab Maghrib.

Western Sahara 

The territory of the former colony of Western Sahara territory has caused a deep-seated antagonism and general mistrust between the two nations that has permeated all aspects of Moroccan-Algerian relations. After Spain announced its intention to abandon the territory in 1975, relations between Morocco and Algeria, both of which had previously presented a united front, disintegrated.  Algeria, although not asserting any territorial claims of its own, was averse to the absorption of the territory by any of its neighbors and supported the Polisario Front's wish to create an independent nation in the territory. Before the Spanish evacuation, the Spanish government had agreed to divide the territory, transferring the majority of the land to Morocco and the remainder to Mauritania. This agreement violated a United Nations (UN) resolution that declared all historical claims by Mauritania or Morocco to be insufficient to justify territorial absorption and drew heavy criticism from Algeria.

Guerrilla movements inside the Saharan territory, particularly the Polisario Front (Frente Popular para la Liberación de Saguia el Hamra y Río de Oro), having fought for Saharan independence since 1973, immediately proclaimed the Sahrawi Arab Democratic Republic (SADR). Algeria recognized this new self-proclaimed state in 1976, and has since pursued a determined diplomatic effort for international recognition of the territory; it has also supplied food, materials, and training to the guerrillas. In 1979, after many years of extensive and fierce guerrilla warfare, Mauritania abandoned its territorial claims and withdrew. Morocco quickly claimed the territory relinquished by Mauritania. Once the SADR gained diplomatic recognition from the Organization of African Unity (OAU) and many other independent states, Morocco came under international pressure. As a result, the Moroccan government finally proposed a national referendum to determine the Saharan territory's sovereignty in 1981. The referendum was to be overseen by the OAU, but the proposal was quickly retracted by the King of Morocco when the OAU could not reach agreement over referendum procedures. In 1987 the Moroccan government again agreed to recognize the Polisario and to meet to "discuss their grievances." Algeria stipulated a solitary precondition for restoration of diplomatic relations—recognition of the Polisario and talks toward a definitive solution to the Western Saharan quagmire. Without a firm commitment from the King of Morocco, Algeria conceded and resumed diplomatic relations with Morocco in 1988.

Border 

In 1994, Morocco accused the Algerian secret Services of being behind the Marrakech attack of 1994, where two Spaniards were killed, and imposed visa requirement on Algerians and nationals of Algerian origin. The immediate response by the Algerian government was the closure of the border with Morocco. The borders are still closed, costing both countries an estimated 2% of their annual growth rate. In 1999, the newly elected Algerian president Abdelaziz Bouteflika attended Hassan II of Morocco's funeral, and declared three days of official mourning in Algeria. That same year, Bouteflika accused Morocco of hosting GIA bases, from which some attacks on Algerians were planned and directed. A few days later, he again accused Morocco of exporting drugs into Algeria. In July 2004, King Mohammed VI abolished visa requirements for Algerians entering Morocco; in April 2006, President Bouteflika reciprocated the gesture. In 2012 Algerian prime minister Ahmed Ouyahia said border reopening was not a priority for his government. Other official declarations imply that this issue is not to be solved soon.

By 2014, an increased number of voices from civil society and intellectuals had asked their respective countries to take steps to reconciliation.

Break of diplomatic relations 
Algeria was opposed to the normalization agreement between Morocco and Israel in December 2020. In July 2021, Amnesty International and Forbidden Stories reported, that Morocco had targeted more than 6,000 Algerian phones, including those of politicians and high-ranking military officials, with Pegasus spyware. In August 2021, Algeria blamed Morocco and Israel of supporting the Movement for the self-determination of Kabylia, which the Algerian President Abdelmadjid Tebboune accused of being involved in the wildfires in northern Algeria. Tebboune accused Morocco of perpetrating hostile acts. In the same month, King Mohammed VI of Morocco reached out for reconciliation with Algeria and offered assistance in Algeria's battle against the fires. Algeria did not respond to the offer.

On 18 August 2021, Tebboune chaired an extraordinary meeting of the High Council of Security to review Algeria's relations to Morocco. The president ordered an intensification of security controls at the borders. On 24 August 2021, Algerian foreign minister Ramtane Lamamra announced the break of diplomatic relations with Morocco. On 27 August 2021, Morocco closed the country's embassy in Algiers, Algeria. Furthermore, on 22 September 2021, Algeria's Supreme Security Council determined to close its airspace to all Moroccan civilian and military aircraft.

On 30 July 2022, during a speech on the 22nd anniversary of his accession to the throne, Mohammed VI called for a renewal of normal relations with Algeria. On 27 September 2022, Algerian Minister of Justice Abderrachid Tabi met with Moroccan Foreign Minister Nasser Bourita in Rabat to hand over Abdelmadjid Tebboune's invitation to the Arab League Summit in Algiers on 1 November 2022 for Mohammed VI. It was the first official visit since the break of diplomatic relations.

2021 issues 
The Algerian authorities have accused Morocco of having killed in a "barbaric bombardment" three truck drivers who were covering the route between the Mauritanian capital, Nouakchott, and the Algerian city of Ouargla and have warned that this "will not go unpunished". According to the same source, the event took place on November 1 when the victims were making a commercial trip between the countries in the area. "Several factors indicate that the Moroccan occupation forces in the Western Sahara carried out this cowardly assassination with sophisticated weaponry", it added.

Amid the deterioration of relations with Morocco, Algeria decided not to renew the contract of the Maghreb–Europe Gas Pipeline (GME), which expired at midnight on October 31, 2021. From November 1 on, Algerian natural gas exports to Spain and Portugal are primarily transported through the Medgaz pipeline (with the short-term possibility of covering further demand either by expanding the Medgaz or by shipping LNG).

See also 

 Expulsion of Moroccans from Algeria

References 

 
Politics of Western Sahara
Bilateral relations of Morocco
Morocco